Muhlenbergia appressa, the Devils Canyon muhly, is a species of grass. It is native to the desert region where California and Arizona border Baja California. Muhlenbergia appressa has also been collected on San Clemente Island, one of the Channel Islands of California, in the chaparral and woodlands habitat..

Muhlenbergia appressa is an annual grass growing up to about 40 centimeters tall. The inflorescence is very narrow, with short, appressed branches. The spikelets have awns up to 3 centimeters long. Spikelets low on the inflorescence often stay wrapped in sheaths and do not bloom.

External links
Jepson Manual Treatment - Muhlenbergia appressa
USDA Plants Profile; Muhlenbergia appressa
Grass Manual Treatment
Muhlenbergia appressa - Photo gallery

appressa
Native grasses of California
Grasses of the United States
Flora of Arizona
Flora of Baja California
Flora of the California desert regions
Natural history of the California chaparral and woodlands
Natural history of the Channel Islands of California
Flora without expected TNC conservation status